Sang-e Charak (also Romanized as Sang-e Chārak; also known as Sang Chārak) is a village in Balesh Rural District, in the Central District of Darab County, Fars Province, Iran. At the 2006 census, its population was 900, in 217 families.

References 

Populated places in Darab County